Aleksandr Sergeyevich Kotlyarov (born 30 December 1983) is a Russian former professional footballer.

Club career
He made his Russian Football National League debut for FC Sibir Novosibirsk on 28 April 2006 in a game against FC Dynamo Makhachkala.

External links
 
 

1983 births
People from Ussuriysk
Living people
Russian footballers
Association football goalkeepers
Russian expatriate footballers
Expatriate footballers in Belarus
FC SKVICH Minsk players
FC Partizan Minsk players
FC Luch Vladivostok players
FC Sibir Novosibirsk players
FC Volga Nizhny Novgorod players
FC Ural Yekaterinburg players
FC Fakel Voronezh players
Belarusian Premier League players
Sportspeople from Primorsky Krai